Eriochilus pulchellus, commonly known as the granite bunny orchid, is a plant in the orchid family Orchidaceae and is endemic to Western Australia. It has a single egg-shaped leaf and up to ten small white flowers with red markings. A relatively common species, it grows in shallow soil on granite outcrops. Its fleshy leaf is held above the ground on a thin stalk.

Description
Flowering occurs from April to May.

Taxonomy and naming
Eriochilus pulchellus was first formally described in 2006 by Stephen Hopper and Andrew Brown from a specimen collected near Manjimup and the description was published in Nuytsia. The specific epithet (pulchellus) is the diminutive form of the Latin word meaning "beautiful", hence "beautiful little", referring to the flowers of this orchid.

Distribution and habitat
The granite bunny orchid grows on granite outcrops between Windy Harbour and Albany, between Esperance and Israelite Bay and in the Darling Range near Perth.

Conservation
Eriochilus pulchellus is classified as "not threatened" by the Western Australian Government Department of Parks and Wildlife.

References

pulchellus
Orchids of Western Australia
Endemic orchids of Australia
Plants described in 2006
Endemic flora of Western Australia
Taxa named by Stephen Hopper